Dwork is a surname. Notable people with the surname include:
 Bernard Dwork (1923–1998), mathematician
 Cynthia Dwork (born 1958), computer scientist
 Debórah Dwork, historian
 Johnny Dwork (born 1959), flying disc freestyle athlete, author, event producer, and artist
 Melvin Dwork (1922–2016), American interior designer and LGBT activist